Firuzi (also Romanized as Fīrūz̄ī and Fīrūzī) is a village in Bidak Rural District, in the Central District of Abadeh County, Fars Province, Iran. At the 2006 census, its population was 225, spread over 78 families.

References 

Populated places in Abadeh County